Charles C. Cox (October 17, 1887 – July 4, 1915) was an American racecar driver who competed in the 1915 Indianapolis 500.  Later that year, he died as a result of injuries sustained in a crash during a  race at Sioux City Speedway.

Indianapolis 500 results

References

External links

1887 births
1915 deaths
People from Montgomery County, Ohio
People from Preble County, Ohio
Sportspeople from Cincinnati
Racing drivers from Ohio
Indianapolis 500 drivers
AAA Championship Car drivers
Racing drivers who died while racing
Sports deaths in South Dakota